The Elks Club in East Liverpool, Ohio was built in 1916.  It was listed on the National Register of Historic Places in 1985.

The building was addressed in a study assessing historic resources in East Liverpool's central business district which resulted in the NRHP listing of several clubhouse buildings (including also Masonic Temple (East Liverpool, Ohio), Odd Fellows Temple (East Liverpool, Ohio), and YMCA (East Liverpool, Ohio)).

References

Clubhouses on the National Register of Historic Places in Ohio
Colonial Revival architecture in Ohio
Neoclassical architecture in Ohio
Cultural infrastructure completed in 1916
East Liverpool, Ohio
Elks buildings
Buildings and structures in Columbiana County, Ohio
National Register of Historic Places in Columbiana County, Ohio